Finch Hatton is a rural town and locality in the Mackay Region, Queensland, Australia.

Geography 

Finch Hatton lies in the valley of Cattle Creek (a tributary of the Pioneer River) which flows from west to east through the locality. Although the centre of the locality beside the creek is at 100 metres above sea level, the northern and southern parts of the locality are mountainous rising to 970 metres in the north and 870 metres in the south.

The valley contains the town, roughly centre of the locality. The Mackay–Eungella Road passes through the valley and the town from west to east, although it is called Anzac Parade within the town.

History

The town is believed to be named after Harold Heneage Finch-Hatton (1856-1904), a grazier of Mount Spencer run (1881–83), and imperial federationist in United Kingdom (1884-1904). He gave an account of his experiences in the area through his book entitled Advance Australia!  This book covers various topics including the sugar industry, cattle grazing, Native Police, Aboriginals, Kanakas and gold mining techniques.

The first settlers were Hermann Wilhelm Zahmel and his wife Adeline Wilhelmina (née Grawunder), who had immigrated from Germany to Queensland in 1872 and 1876 respectively. They married in Mackay in 1877. In 1889 the Zahmels acquired a parcel of land (Portion 1044 in the Parish of Mia Mia) to the west of the present-day town, where they raised a family of nine children.

The Cattle Creek Sugar Mill commenced in 1906, closing in 1990. It was located on the south side of Anzac Parade between the railway station and the school.

Finch Hatton Post Office opened by December 1906 (replacing a receiving office named Pelion open from December 1895).

Finch Hatton State School opened on 5 July 1909.

The Finch Hatton War Memorial was erected in 1921. It commemorated those servicemen from Finch Hatton and Netherdale who died in World War I. Later an additional plaque was added with the details of those who died in World War II. The memorial is located in Anzac Parade.

On 18 February 1958, Mackay was hit with massive flooding caused by heavy rainfall upstream with 878 mm of rain falling at Finch Hatton in 24 hours. The water flowed down the valley and flooded Mackay within hours. Residents were rescued off rooftops by boats and taken to emergency accommodation. The flood broke Australian records.

Heritage listings

Finch Hatton has a number of heritage-listed sites, including:
 Anzac Parade: Finch Hatton War Memorial
 Mackay-Eungella Road: Finch Hatton railway station

Education
Finch Hatton State School is a co-educational government primary (P-6) school located on the Mackay-Eungella Road. In 2016, it had an enrolment of 49 students with 8 teachers (5 equivalent full-time) and 7 non-teaching staff (3 equivalent full-time).

Amenities
The Mackay Regional Council operates a mobile library service on a fortnightly schedule at the corner of Zahmel Street and Mackay-Eungella Road.

See also 
 List of sugar mills in Queensland
 List of tramways in Queensland

References

Further reading

External links 

 
 

 
Mackay Region
Towns in Queensland
Localities in Queensland